The Honda CL70 Scrambler was a small motorcycle with a  four-stroke engine, a pressed steel frame and a four-speed manual gearbox.  It was built by Honda between 1969 and 1973.  It essentially replaced the Honda CL90. It was very similar to a CL50 with a larger engine. As a scrambler, it had a high-mount exhaust and a high rear fender. This allowed the look, though not really the capability, of extended off-road capability, before real dual-sport motorcycles were available.

CL70